Qanatghestan Rural District (Dehestān-e Qanātqestān) is a rural district (dehestan) in Mahan District, Kerman County, Kerman Province, Iran. At the 2006 census, its population was 2,449, in 637 families. The rural district has 25 villages.

References 

Rural Districts of Kerman Province
Kerman County